Martin Meredith is a historian, journalist, and biographer. He has written several books on Africa and its modern history.

Meredith first worked as a foreign correspondent in Africa for The Observer and Sunday Times, then as a research fellow at St Antony's College, Oxford. Living near Oxford, he is now an independent commentator and author.

Meredith's writing has been described as authoritative and well-documented, despite the pessimism so often imposed upon his subject matter.

Bibliography 
 The Fortunes of Africa: A 5,000-Year History of Wealth, Greed and Endeavour (2014) 
 The State of Africa: A History of the Continent Since Independence (2011)
 
 Diamonds, Gold and War (2007) 
 Mugabe: Power, Plunder, and the Struggle for Zimbabwe's Future (2007) 
 The State of Africa: A History of Fifty Years of Independence (2005) 
 The Fate of Africa: From the Hopes of Freedom to the Heart of Despair (2005) 
 Elephant Destiny: Biography Of An Endangered Species In Africa (2004) 
 Our Votes, Our Guns: Robert Mugabe and the Tragedy of Zimbabwe (2003) 
 Fischer's Choice (2002) 
 Coming to Terms: South Africa’s Search for Truth (2001) 
 Nelson Mandela: A Biography (1999) 
South Africa’s New Era: The 1994 Election (1994) 
 In the Name of Apartheid: South Africa In The Post War Period (1988) 
The First Dance of Freedom (1985) 
 The Past is Another Country: Rhodesia 1890–1979 (1979)

See also
Colin Legum (1919–2003), South African journalist and writer on Africa
Basil Davidson (1914–2010), British journalist and writer on Africa

References

External links
  
 Martin Meredith: Nelson Mandela: A Biography – Interview May 2010
 Perseus Books

British biographers
British historians
British reporters and correspondents
Fellows of St Antony's College, Oxford
Historians of Africa
Living people
Year of birth missing (living people)